The State University of Malang (abbreviated as UM), formerly the Institute of Teacher Education and Educational Sciences of Malang (abbreviated as IKIP Malang), is one of the state universities in Indonesia. Located in Malang and Blitar, East Java, UM was established in October 18, 1954 as PTPG Malang, as School of Education of Airlangga University, making it one of the oldest teaching institutes in Indonesia. UM was separated from Airlangga University on 20 May 1964 to become IKIP Malang. In 1999, IKIP Malang formally changed its status from an institute to a state university.

In 2010, UM ranked 6th as the best university in Indonesia by Webometrics, but sank to 16th in 2015. However, also in 2015, UM was accredited as an A-class university by the National Accreditation Board of Higher Education (BAN-PT) with a score of 372 points, just below UGM (378) and IPB (375).

Faculties
The State University of Malang has eight faculties and one post-graduate program.
 Faculty of Education
 Faculty of Letters
 Faculty of Mathematics and Natural Sciences
 Faculty of Economics and Business
 Faculty of Engineering
 Faculty of Sport Sciences
 Faculty of Social Sciences
 Faculty of Psychology Education
 Post-Graduate Program (Master's Program and Doctoral Program)

Campus
The main teaching, learning and research activities are conducted at the main campus, which is located at Jl. Semarang 5 Malang. The second campus is located at Jl. Ki Ageng Gribig 45 Sawojajar, Malang, and the third campus is located at Jl. Ir Soekarno No 3 Blitar.

Graha Cakrawala that is located in the main campus of State University of Malang, has been used for national and international events, mostly for sports and arts events, and has a seating capacity over 7000.

Notable alumni
 Muhadjir Effendy, Minister of Culture and Education 2016-2019
 Awang Faroek Ishak , Governor of East Kalimantan
 Peni Suparto, Former Mayor of Malang
 Mario Teguh, entrepreneur

International Cooperation
State University of Malang has many cooperations with other foreign universities.
Curtin University , Australia
Walailak University , Thailand
Guangxi Normal University , China
University of South Australia
Bangkok University
Hainan University
Illinois State University
Université Laval
Catholic University of Daegu
University of Technology, Malaysia
Federal University of Santa Catarina, Brazil

References

External links
 Official site

Universities in Indonesia
Educational institutions established in 1954
1954 establishments in Indonesia
Universities in East Java
Malang
Blitar
Indonesian state universities